Brett Boretti (born December 14, 1971) is an American college baseball coach who has been the head coach of Columbia since the start of the 2006 season.  Prior to that, he was the head coach at Division III Franklin & Marshall from 2001 to 2005. As a head coach, Boretti has led teams to four NCAA Tournaments, three of them in Division I.

Playing career
Boretti attended Davidson College, where he graduated from in 1994.  He played football during his freshman year and baseball for all four years.  A catcher, he was named First-Team All-Southern Conference as both a junior and a senior. He also spent time in the Cape Cod Baseball League in 1992 and 1993 with the Wareham Gatemen and was named a league all-star in 1993.

He had a short career in professional baseball. He played for the Brainerd Bears in the short-lived North Central League in 1994; he hit .283 and drove in 31 runs and was named a league all-star. In the midst of the 1994–95 Major League Baseball strike, when owners threatened to play the 1995 season with replacement players, Boretti spent spring training with the Cleveland Indians.

Coaching career

Assistant positions
Boretti's coaching career began at Endicott, a Division III school located in his hometown of Beverly, Massachusetts.  After spending the 1995 season at Endicott, he was an assistant at Davidson from 1996 to 1998 and Brown from 1999 to 2000.

Franklin & Marshall
Boretti's first head coaching position came at Division III Franklin & Marshall, where he replaced Mark Cole ahead of the 2001 season. Boretti spent five seasons at the school, where he had an overall record of 116–82.

In 2002, Boretti's second season, the Diplomats went 31–10 and shared the Centennial Conference title with Johns Hopkins.  The team made the conference tournament, where it lost in the second round.  In 2005, Franklin & Marshall won the Centennial outright and defeated Johns Hopkins in the conference championship series to receive an automatic bid to the NCAA Tournament.  There, it lost a pair of 1–0 games to Rowan (in 10 innings) and Messiah.

Columbia
Boretti was hired at Division I Columbia ahead of the 2006 season; he replaced Paul Fernandes, who had been promoted to associate athletic director.

After finishing third in the Gehrig Division in 2006 and 2007, the Lions won the division with a 15–5 record in 2008.  They defeated Rolfe Division champion Dartmouth in the Ivy Championship Series to advance to the NCAA Tournament, Columbia's first since 1976.  At the Conway Regional, the Lions lost to host Coastal Carolina, 10–2, and second-seeded East Carolina, 9–0.

The Lions had their first winning season under Boretti in 2010, when they went 27–20 and won the Gehrig Division for the second time. They then lost to Dartmouth in the Ivy Championship.

Under Boretti, Columbia's home field, Robertson Field at Satow Stadium, underwent renovations in 2007 and 2010.

After finishing third in the division in 2011 and 2012, Columbia won back-to-back Ivy League titles in 2013 and 2014, defeating Dartmouth in the championship series in both years.  At the Fullerton Regional in 2013, Columbia went 1–2, getting its first NCAA Tournament win against third-seeded New Mexico.  At the Coral Gables Regional in 2014, the Lions received the third seed and went 0–2.

From 2006 to 2014, six Columbia players have won major awards in the Ivy League, including Dario Pizzano, who was named Rookie of the Year in 2010 and Player of the year in 2012.  Four Lions have been selected in the Major League Baseball Draft, with the highest pick being Pizzano, a 15th-round selection of the Seattle Mariners in 2012.

Head coaching record
Below is a table of Boretti's yearly records as a collegiate head baseball coach.

See also
 List of current NCAA Division I baseball coaches
 Columbia Lions

References

1971 births
Living people
Baseball players from Massachusetts
Brainerd Bears players
Brown Bears baseball coaches
Columbia Lions baseball coaches
Davidson Wildcats baseball coaches
Davidson Wildcats baseball players
Davidson Wildcats football players
Endicott Gulls baseball coaches
Franklin & Marshall Diplomats baseball coaches
Wareham Gatemen players
Sportspeople from Beverly, Massachusetts